Thereuonema tuberculata is a centipede species in the family Scutigeridae. It is native to China, the Korean peninsula, and Japan, and has recently been identified as an introduced species in North America where it is found primarily in the eastern United States, but has been found as far west as Nebraska. In its introduced range it is commonly confused with Scutigera coleoptrata.

References

External links 
 
 

Scutigeromorpha
Animals described in 1862
Arthropods of China